Galfar Engineering and Contracting SAOG was founded by Dr. Salim Said Al Fannah Al Araimi, Sheikh Mohamed Rashid Al Fannah Al Araimi and Dr. P. Mohamed Ali. Galfar Engineering is known as one of the largest engineering, contracting and construction companies in the Sultanate of Oman. Its headquarters is situated in Ghala, Muscat, Sultanate of Oman. An article in The Economic Times claims it to be one of the top five engineering contractors across the Gulf. It was established in January 1972. It has a turnover of US$1 billion. Galfar employs over 23,000 workers, only in Oman, with more than 7,000 different kinds of plant and equipment.

References

External links
 

Construction and civil engineering companies established in 1972
Companies of Oman
1972 establishments in Oman